Lu Bofei  (born August 2, 1979) is a Chinese footballer who plays as a midfielder for Jiangsu Sainty in the Chinese Super League.

Club career
Lu Bofei started his professional footballer career with Bayi Football Team in 1999, however he was loaned out to Changchun Yatai the following season to gain playing time. His loan was fairly successful and Lu Bofei played in 19 league games and scored 2 goals for Changchun Yatai. By the 2001 season Lu Bofei had established himself as regular member of the Bayi Football Team, however by 2003 Bayi had disbanded and Lu Bofei would move to Shenzhen Jianlibao. His move to Shenzhen Jianlibao (now known as Shenzhen Xiangxue Eisiti) was to prove extremely successful as Shenzhen Jianlibao won the China Super League with Lu Bofei playing a significant part in their success.

After a disappointing 2006 season which saw Shenzhen Jianlibao unable to build on their earlier success Lu Bofei moved to the newly promoted Wuhan Guanggu. His career at Wuhan Guanggu was to prove extremely disappointing as Lu Bofei was unable to establish himself as first choice regular and Wuhan Guanggu were controversially relegated then subsequently disbanded during the Chinese Super League 2008 league season after the club's management did not accept the punishment given to them by the Chinese Football Association after a scuffle broke out during a league game against Beijing Guoan on September 27, 2008. This lead Lu Bofei to join top tier club Jiangsu Shuntian at the beginning of the 2009 season.

International career
Lu Bofei made his senior level debut coming on January 10, 2008 as a late substitute for Zhao Junzhe against United Arab Emirates in a friendly that ended in a 0-0 draw.

Honours
Shenzhen Jianlibao
Chinese Super League: 2004

Jiangsu Sainty
Chinese FA Super Cup: 2013

References

External links
 
 
 Player stats at Sohu.com

1979 births
Living people
Chinese footballers
Footballers from Beijing
China international footballers
Bayi Football Team players
Changchun Yatai F.C. players
Shenzhen F.C. players
Wuhan Guanggu players
Jiangsu F.C. players
Chinese Super League players
Association football midfielders